"It's the Talk of the Town" is a popular song written by Jerry Livingston, the lyrics by Al J. Neiburg and Marty Symes.

The song was published in 1933.

The song is a pop standard, with many versions recorded by many artists. A recording by Glen Gray and the Casa Loma Orchestra (vocal by Kenny Sargent) reached number six in the United States charts in 1933 and a version by Fletcher Henderson reached No. 20 the same year.

Other notable performances
Connie Boswell (1933)
Annette Hanshaw (1933)
Benny Goodman with Art Lund (1942)
Bing Crosby (recorded August 29, 1945 with Jimmy Dorsey and His Orchestra). 
Harry James (1946)
Coleman Hawkins (1950)
Dick Haymes (1952)
Georgia Gibbs - for her album The Man That Got Away (1953)
Johnnie Ray (single release 1953)
Perry Como - for his album So Smooth (1955)
Joni James - for her EP The Talk of the Town (1955)
Lester Young Tenor sax, with Oscar Peterson piano, Harry 'Sweets' Edison, Buck Clayton. (1955)
The Four Aces with the Jack Pleis Orchestra (1956)
Julie London - for her album Lonely Girl (1956)
Sam Cooke - for his album Encore (1958)
Joe Williams - for his album A Man Ain't Supposed to Cry (1958).
Connie Francis for her album Who's Sorry Now? (1958)
Frankie Laine - for his album Torchin' (1958).
Ray Conniff Singers - for the album It's the Talk of the Town (1959).
Anthony Newley - for his album Love Is a Now and Then Thing (1960).
Fats Domino - for his album ...A Lot of Dominos! (1960).
Brenda Lee - for her album Sincerely, Brenda Lee (1962)
Ronnie Dove for his album Cry (1967)
Boulevard of Broken Dreams Orchestra for their album It's the Talk of the Town - and Other Sad Songs (1985)

References

Songs with lyrics by Al J. Neiburg
Songs with lyrics by Marty Symes
1933 songs
Songs written by Jerry Livingston